Huangshawan Subdistrict is a subdistrict and the seat of Shigu District in Hengyang, Hunan, China. The subdistrict of Huangshawan has 2 villages and 7 communities under its jurisdiction.

History
The subdistrict of Huangshawan was formed as a division of the former Suburb District in July 1996. the Suburb District ceased to be a separated district, it was transferred to Shigu District in June 2001. Through the merger of village-level divisions in 2016, its division was reduced to 9 from 13.

Subdivisions
The newly established subdistrict of Huangshawan administered 10 villages of Tuanjie, Jinbu, Chaoyang, Songmu, Youyi, Songmei, Qingshi, Zhangmu, Lingguanmiao and Jianxin, and Songmu Agricultural Science Center, 2 communities of Yanqihu and Xiashendu in 2015. Through the merger of village-level divisions in 2016, its division was reduced to 9 from 13, the subdistrict has 7 communities and 2 villages under its jurisdiction.

7 villages
 Chaoyang Village
 Lingguanmiao Village
 Songmu Village
 Jinbu Village
 Qingshi Village
 Songmei Village
 Tuanjie Village

2 communities
 Xiashendu community
 Yanqihu Community

References

Shigu District
Subdistricts of Hunan